Otago Regional Council (ORC) is the regional council for Otago in the South Island of New Zealand. The council's principal office is Regional House on Stafford Street in Dunedin with 250-275 staff, with smaller offices in Queenstown and Alexandra. They are responsible for sustainably managing Otago’s natural resources of land, air and water on behalf of the community. Property owners pay rates to both the local and regional councils (e.g. the Dunedin City Council and Otago Regional Council).  In June 2022 the council approved an annual plan of $109m for 2022-2023 with an 18%rates rise. 

Otago regional councillors are elected for three-year terms. The latest elections in 2022 have resulted in 4 new councillors, including Alan Somerville (Affiliated with the Green Ōtepoti), Elliot Weir, Lloyd McCall and Tim Mepham.

Most Otago Regional Councillors are unaffiliated, with only one being listed as "Independent" and one affiliated with the Green Party's Dunedin branch. The longest-serving members of the Otago Regional Council are Bryan Scott, an Independent from Dunedin, and Gretchen Robertson, who is an Unaffiliated Councillor from Dunedin and the current chairperson since 2022, with Lloyd McCall from the Molyneux Constituency as Deputy Chairperson since 2022. Both Bryan and Gretchen entered the ORC in 2004.

Composition 
The Otago Regional Council consists of 12 members elected from 4 constituencies. Dunedin (6), Dunstan (3), Molyneux (2) and Moeraki (1).

Constituencies

Responsibilities 
The responsibilities of the Otago Regional Council are the same as other Regional Councils in New Zealand, but for the Otago region. The responsibilities include:

 Protecting Otago's environment, including but not limited to rivers, freshwater, air, coastal waters, and land.
 Managing and preventing marine pollution and oil spills.
 Preparedness for Civil Defence across the Otago Region, including floods and earthquakes.
 Transport planning and passenger services across the region.
 Ensuring general regional well-being.

Assets 
In the Otago Regional Council's annual report, containing the Council's financial report from 2021-22, the Otago Regional Council states that the Council has $964.3m in total assets, exceeding their budgeted amount by $225m. The Council's most valuable asset is Port Otago, which is worth approximately $700m and of which, the council owns 100% of.

Controversies 2019-2020

2019 Investigation by the Ministry for the Environment regarding water permits (Skelton Report) 
On 19 May 2019, the Government launched an investigation into the Otago Regional Council, analyzing the council's ability to deal with incoming water permit replacement applications as a result of the century-old water permits being replaced with Resource Management Act (RMA) consents. This investigation took place after a council report was leaked to the media which detailed concerns about the council's lack of ability to deal with new water permit applications, which the Minister for the Environment David Parker summarized in a letter to the then Chairperson Marian Hobbs which stated that Professor Peter Skelton concluded that "the Otago Region does not have a fit for purpose planning framework in place" to deal with incoming water permits. Along with this conclusion, the Minister made a series of recommendations to the council including a fully developed freshwater management planning regime to assess water consent applications, to develop and initiate a "programme of work" which would fully review the RPS by November 2020 and a refurbished and original Land and Water Regional Plan (LWRP), and finally for the Otago Regional Council to develop a plan change to provide an appropriate "interim planning and consenting framework" which would manage freshwater until allocation limits are set up.

In the report, David Parker expressed disagreement with Professor Skelton's recommendation that he begins a process to change the date for expiry of specific deemed permits until 2025, commenting: "I am not in favour of changing the RMA to extend the date for expiry of the deemed permits..... I prefer that ORC takes steps to resolve the matter rather than taking up the time of Parliament." Later, the date for expiry of water permits and discharge permits was reached and on 1 October 2022, the 30th anniversary of the Resource Management Act, they officially expired.

2020 Leadership Change 
After the 2019 election, on 23 October 2019, former minister of the environment Marian Hobbs was confirmed as the Chair of the newly elected Council through a majority vote by her fellow councillors. Hobbs attracted criticism from her fellow Councillors after she wrote to Minister for the Environment Hon. David Parker during the national COVID-19 lockdown asked him whether or not he would consider appointing a commissioner to the Council if she lost a vote on policy implementation.

Marian Hobbs before her sacking as Chairwoman had on multiple occasions affirmed that she would not step down willingly and although she did declare "my chances are nil" when asked about her possibly retaining the position, she instead wanted the public to witness the removal of her as Chairwoman. Her position was not completely unfounded, as it is thought that a comfortable majority of councillors already supported new leadership.

On 15 June 2020, nine of the Councillors wrote to the Chief Executive, asking for an extraordinary meeting to be called to remove Hobbs as Chair. An extraordinary meeting of the Council was subsequently called for on  8 July 2021, where she made an opening statement including "I was too effective in pushing the water reforms" and that "she would not back away from arguing for the environment". It was clear that she had lost the support of the council and she was removed as chair through a majority vote (9-2).  Andrew Noone was then elected unopposed as Chair  and stood successfully for re-election in 2022 in the Dunedin Constituency. Marian Hobbs resigned on 1 November 2021, and did not stand for re-election in the 2022 Local Elections.

References

External links
Otago Regional Council
localcouncils.govt.nz (Department of Internal Affairs) - Otago Regional Council information

Politics of Otago
Regional councils of New Zealand